Haunted was a British supernatural drama series broadcast by ITV (ABC). It ran for eight episodes from 1967–68 and starred Patrick Mower as University lecturer Michael West, who travelled around Britain investigating reported paranormal phenomena. The entire series was later wiped from the ITV archives. None of the episodes are known to have survived on film.

Episode list
"I Like It Here"
"The Chinese Butterfly"
"To Blow My Name About"
"Many Happy Returns"
"After the Funeral"
"Living Doll"
"Through a Glass Darkly"
"The Girl on the Swing"

External links
Haunted (Action TV).

British supernatural television shows
ITV television dramas
1960s British drama television series
Television shows produced by ABC Weekend TV
English-language television shows
1967 British television series debuts
1968 British television series endings
Lost television shows